HMS Upshot was a V-class submarine of the Royal Navy. She was built during the Second World War as part of the second batch (18 in number) of V-class submarines ordered on 21 May 1942.

She was built by Vickers-Armstrong (Barrow-in-Furness), being laid down on 3 May 1943, launched on 24 March 1944, and finally commissioned on 15 May 1944.

Fate 
The submarine was decommissioned on 2 November 1949 and broken up for scrap in Preston.

Notes

References 
 
 HMS Upshot at Uboat.net

External links
 Upshot being broken up in 1949.

 

British V-class submarines
Ships built in Barrow-in-Furness
1944 ships
World War II submarines of the United Kingdom